Jaisalmer TV Tower is one of the tallest structures in India, located at Ramgarh village of Jaisalmer district of Rajasthan.

References

Towers completed in 1993
Jaisalmer
Communication towers in India
Buildings and structures in Jaisalmer
1993 establishments in Rajasthan
20th-century architecture in India